Polistiopsis is a genus of parasitic flies in the family Tachinidae. There are at least two described species in Polistiopsis.

Species
These two species belong to the genus Polistiopsis:
 Polistiopsis mima Townsend, 1915
 Polistiopsis williamsi Arnaud, 1966

References

Further reading

 
 
 
 

Tachinidae
Articles created by Qbugbot